Harold Stepney Williams (March 28, 1864, Llanelly – February 24, 1954, Swansea) was the Archdeacon of Gower from 1923 until his death.

Williams was educated at Durham University and ordained in 1888. After curacies in Bromborough, Tredegar and Swansea he was the incumbent at Oystermouth from 1898 until 1938.

References

1864 births
People from Monmouthshire
1954 deaths
Archdeacons of Gower
Alumni of St Cuthbert's Society, Durham